Association Sportive d'Hammamet H.C (Arabic: الجمعية الرياضية بالحمامات ) is a Tunisian handball team based in Hammamet, Tunisia, that plays in Tunisian Professional Handball League.

Honours

National titles
Tunisian Handball Cup:
 Winners: 2011–12
African Men's Handball Cup Winners' Cup:
 Runner-up: 2003
Arab Handball Championship of Winners' Cup:
 Runner-up: 2017
Arab Handball Championship of Champions:
 Runner-up: 2021

Famous Players
  Wael Jallouz
  Rayan Aribi
  Sérgio Lopes

External links
 Official website

Handball clubs established in 1945
Tunisian handball clubs
Hammamet, Tunisia
1945 establishments in Tunisia